Swamiyar Madam is a village located in Kanyakumari district of Tamil Nadu, India on National Highway 66 approximately 44 km south east of Trivandrum. This village has a Masjid named Shahul Hameediya Jumma Masjid. It is the birthplace of Mr. D.S.KUMAR who completed his education in Govt school Kattathurai, in 1983.

Swamiyarmadam is also famous for Saint Thadeyus church, Kanjimadam Sree Dharma Sastha Temple, and sree Vana Sastha Sree Vana Durga Temple, Ithiyapuramkaavu. The Kuruswamy Mani General Merchant Store is about 40 years old.

The original name of Swamiyarmadam is Elanthai Ampalam. The market is still called Elanthaiampalam Market.

Villages in Kanyakumari district